Lie Cliff is a prominent rock cliff at the eastern foot of Mount Steere, in the Crary Mountains of Antarctica. It was mapped by the United States Geological Survey from surveys and U.S. Navy aerial photography, 1959–66, and was named by the Advisory Committee on Antarctic Names for Hans P. Lie, a United States Antarctic Research Program ionospheric physicist at Siple Station in the 1970–71 and 1973–74 summer seasons.

References

Cliffs of Marie Byrd Land
Crary Mountains